Elisabeth of Bavaria-Munich (2 February 1443 in Munich – 5 March 1484 in Leipzig) was a princess of Bavaria-Munich by birth and by marriage Electress of Saxony.

Life 
Elizabeth was a daughter of the Duke Albert the Pious of Bavaria-Munich (1401–1460) from his marriage to Anna of Brunswick-Grubenhagen-Einbeck (1420–1474), daughter of the Duke Eric I of Brunswick-Grubenhagen.

She married on 25 November 1460 in Leipzig  with the prince who later became the Elector Ernest of Saxony (1441–1486).  The engagement took place some ten years before and the marriage should have taken place in 1456, according to the marriage agreement.  In 1471, a new palace was built on the Castle Hill in Meissen, as a residence for the royal household.  Elisabeth was a key influencing factor for the careful education of her children and especially their scientific training.  The marriage of the royal couple was seen as happy and Ernest loved his wife dearly.

The Princess, who is considered the matriarch of the Ernestine line of the House of Wettin, died after a long illness,  aged 41.  At the end of her life, she was bedridden and for her care a bed with wheels and a hoist was used.  Elisabeth died almost simultaneously with her son Adalbert and her mother-in-law Margaret.  Ernest died in August of the same year.   Elizabeth's son, Frederick the Wise was said to have written to Spalatin that he had ridden from one funeral to the next.

Children 
From their marriage with Ernest, Elizabeth had the following children:
 Christina (1461–1521)
 married in 1478 King  John I of Denmark, Norway and Sweden (1455–1513)
 Frederick the Wise (1462–1525), Elector of Saxony
 Ernest (1464–1513), Archbishop of Magdeburg, Administrator of Halberstadt
 Adalbert (1467–1484), Administrator of the Archdiocese of Mainz.
 John the Steadfast (1468–1532), Elector of Saxony
 married firstly in 1500 Princess Sophie of Mecklenburg-Schwerin (1481–1503)
 married secondly in 1513 Princess Margarete of Anhalt (1494–1521)
 Margarete (1469–1528)
married in 1487 Duke Henry I of Brunswick-Lüneburg (1468–1532)
 Wolfgang (1473–1478)

Ancestors

Footnotes

References 
 Reiner Gross: Die Wettiner, Kohlhammer Verlag, 2007, p. 83

|-

1443 births
1484 deaths
15th-century German people
15th-century German women
House of Wettin
House of Wittelsbach
Electresses of Saxony
Daughters of monarchs